MacSween and McSween are surnames of Gaelic origin. People with those surnames include:

Alexander McSween (1843–1878), Canadian-American participant in the Lincoln County War of 1878
Donald McSween (born 1964), American ice hockey player
 Harold B. McSween (19262002), U.S. Representative from Louisiana.
 Harry McSween (born 1945), American geologist and planetologist
 John MacSween, Scottish nobleman
 John MacSween (haggis entrepreneur) (19392006), Scottish butcher and entrepreneur
 MacSween, a Scottish company founded by John MacSween, known for making haggis
 Roderick MacSween (born 1935), Scottish pathologist
Susan McSween (18451931), American rancher
Pierre-Yves McSween, French Canadian accountant and accounting media host

See also
 Clan MacQueen, a Scottish clan also known as Clan MacSween
 Mac Suibhne (surname)
5223 McSween, an asteroid named after Harry McSween
 Barry MacSweeney (19482000), English poet and journalist
 McSweeney (surname)
 Castle Sween, a Scottish castle associated with Clan Sweeney
 Sweeney (name)
 Clan Sweeney (also known as Clan MacSweeney), an Irish clan of Scottish origin
 Mary MacSwiney (18721942), Irish politician and educationalist